Owen Holland (died 1601), of Plas Berw, Llanidan, Anglesey, was a Welsh politician.

He was the only son of Edward Holland of Plas Berw, Llanidan, Anglesey.

He was a Member (MP) of the Parliament of England for Anglesey in 1584 and  High Sheriff of Anglesey for 1590 and 1598.

He married Elizabeth, the daughter of Sir Richard Bulkeley, with whom he had eight sons and five daughters.

References

16th-century births
1601 deaths
People from Anglesey
16th-century Welsh politicians
Members of the Parliament of England (pre-1707) for constituencies in Wales
High Sheriffs of Anglesey
English MPs 1584–1585